JS Ariake (DD-109) (ありあけ) is the ninth ship of s. She was commissioned on 6 March 2002.

Design
The hull design was completely renovated from first-generation DDs. In addition to increasing the size in order to reduce the underwater radiation noise, both superstructure and hull was inclined to reduce the radar cross-section. There is however no angled tripod mainmast like the one of the American  because of the heavy weather of the Sea of Japan in winter. Destroyers built under the First Defense Build-up Plan, including the former , adopted a unique long forecastle style called "Oranda-zaka".

The engine arrangement is COGAG as same as Asagiri class, but a pair of engines are updated to Spey SM1C. And the remaining one pair are replaced by LM2500, same as Kongō class.

Construction and career
Ariake was laid down on 18 May 1999 at Mitsubishi Heavy Industries in Kobe as part of the 1997 plan and launched on 16 October 2000. Commissioned on 6 March 2002, the vessel was incorporated into the 6th Escort Corps of the 2nd Escort Corps and deployed to Sasebo.

On 13 September 2020, she departed from Sasebo base for the Gulf of Aden off the coast of Somalia as the 37th dispatched anti-piracy action water squadron.

Gallery

Citations

References

 
 
 Saunders, Stephen. IHS Jane's Fighting Ships 2013-2014. Jane's Information Group (2003). 

2000 ships
Murasame-class destroyers (1994)
Ships built by Mitsubishi Heavy Industries